Myrsineae or Myrsineai was a town of ancient Greece on the island of Paros. The town is mentioned in several inscriptions.

Its site is located on Paros.

References

Populated places in the ancient Aegean islands
Former populated places in Greece
Paros